Gisi Fleischmann (21 January 1892 – 18 October 1944) was a Zionist activist and the leader of the Bratislava Working Group, one of the best known Jewish rescue groups during the Holocaust. Fleischmann was arrested on 15 October 1944 and was murdered in the Auschwitz concentration camp three days later.

Life
Fleischmann worked for a number of Jewish organizations. She founded the Slovakia chapter of the Women's International Zionist Organization and served on the executive committee of Histadrut in Slovakia. She was also a representative of the Joint Distribution Committee.

On 4 September 1939, her brother, the lawyer Gustav Fischer, was beaten to death in Bratislava. His wife, Lili, committed suicide shortly thereafter.

The Holocaust 

At Rabbi Weissmandl's initiative, the Working Group was also responsible for the ambitious but ill-fated Europa Plan which would have seen large numbers of European Jews rescued from the Nazi and Fascist murderers. An agreement was negotiated with the Nazis in late 1942 and one to two million dollars ransom was required to stop most transports. The Germans asked for a 10% down payment. Nothing came of it, reportedly because Sally Mayer was unwilling to provide the down-payment since currency transfer to Nazis was illegal. Another opinion is that Heinrich Himmler intervened in August 1943. Unfortunately, the down payment was never made.

The Working Group also played a central role in the distribution of the Auschwitz Report in spring of 1944 written by Slovakian Jews Rudolf Vrba and Alfred Wetzler. Rabbi Weissmandl's version ultimately reached George Mantello in Switzerland via Budapest. He immediately published the report's summary. That triggered a major Swiss grass-roots protest in the Swiss press, churches and streets. It was a major factor leading to President Roosevelt, Winston Churchill and others threatening Hungary's regent Horthy with post-war retribution if he did not immediately stop the transports. This significantly influenced Horthy to stop the transports. At the time, about 12,000 Jews per day were transported from Hungary to Auschwitz.  Consequently, Raoul Wallenberg was able to go to Budapest, where he and diplomats like Carl Lutz, Angelo Rotta, and others rescued large numbers of Jews.

Death and legacy 
 
Following the Slovak National Uprising of August - October 1944, the Germans invaded Slovakia and deported the remaining Jews. The Working Group was unable to bribe or negotiate with the German military authorities, and a massive roundup on the night of 28 September caught 1,800 Jews in Bratislava, including most of the Working Group's leadership. Fleischmann was not arrested, and continued to help Jews until she was deported on the last transport to Auschwitz on 17 October. Designated "return unwanted," she was probably murdered upon arrival.

Gideon Hausner, prosecutor at the Eichmann trial, said that "Fleischmann's name deserves to be immortalized in the annals of our people, and her memory should be bequeathed to further generations as a radiant example of heroism and of boundless devotion."

References

Sources
 Fuchs, Dr. Abraham (1984). The Unheeded Cry (also in Hebrew as Karati V'ein Oneh). Mesorah Publications.
 Hecht, Ben. Perfidy (also in Hebrew as Kachas)
 Kranzler, Dr. David. Thy Brother's Blood
 Fatran, Gila. The "Working Group", Holocaust and Genocide Studies, 8:2 (1994:Fall) 164-201; also see correspondence in issue 9:2 (1995:Fall) 269-276
 VERAfilm (Prague), Among Blind Fools (documentary video) 
 https://web.archive.org/web/20110718084924/http://www.verafilm.cz/projects-fools-us.html
 Nešťáková, Denisa (2017). Gisi Fleischmann – przywódczyni Żydów na Słowacji podczas II wojnyświatowej. In. Elity i przedstawiciele społeczności żydowskiej podczas II wojny światowej. Warszawa. pp. 473–489.
 The Rescuers by David Ben Reuven (song)

External links 
 Prominent Members of the Working Group, The Story of the Jewish Community in Bratislava, Yad Vashem. Retrieved 22 December 2013
 http://www.bookrags.com/biography/gisi-fleischmann/
 http://www.go2films.com/Coming-Soon/Gisi Documentary film about Gisi Fleischmann, 2014

1892 births
1944 deaths
Slovak Jews
Bratislava Working Group members
People who died in Auschwitz concentration camp
Czechoslovak civilians killed in World War II
People from Bratislava
Czechoslovak Jews who died in the Holocaust
Ústredňa Židov employees
Female resistance members of World War II
Jewish women
Czechoslovak women
Jewish women activists
Zionist activists
Slovak Zionists